The 2023 season will be the Houston Gamblers' upcoming 2nd season in the United States Football League and their 1st under head coach/general manager tandem of Curtis Johnson and Robert Morris.

Draft

Personnel

Roster

Staff

Schedule

Regular Season

Standings

References

Houston
Houston Gamblers
Houston Gamblers (2022)